Sir John Bampfylde, 1st Baronet (c. 1610 – April 1650) of Poltimore and North Molton and Tamerton Foliot, all in Devon, was an English lawyer and politician. He was one of Devonshire's Parliamentarian leaders during the Civil War.

Origins

Bampfylde was the third son of John Bampfield of Poltimore and North Molton in Devon, by his wife, Elizabeth Drake, daughter of Thomas Drake (d. 1610) of Buckland Drake, a brother of the great Admiral Sir Francis Drake (1546–1596). Over the 17th century the family's surname changed from Baumfield to Bamfield to Bampfield to Bampfylde.

Education
He matriculated at Wadham College, Oxford on 30 October 1629, aged 19 and was a student of Middle Temple in 1630.

Career
In November 1640 Bampfylde was elected a Member of Parliament for Penryn, Cornwall, in the Long Parliament. In the Civil War Bampfylde firstly allied himself with the Royalists, for which he was created a baronet, of Poltimore, in the County of Devon by King Charles I on 14 July 1641. He later sided with the Parliamentarian side. He sat in the Long Parliament until 1648 when he was secluded under Pride's Purge.

Marriage and children

On 3 May 1637 Bampfylde married Gertrude Coplestone (d. 1658), a daughter of Amias Coplestone (1582–1621) of Copleston in the parish of Colebrooke and of Warleigh House in the parish of Tamerton Foliot, both in Devon. She was a co-heiress to her brother John V Coplestone (1609–1632), and inherited amongst other properties the manor of Tamerton Foliot, which thus passed into the Bampfylde family. The Bampfylde family used Warleigh House at Tamerton Foliot as a secondary seat. By Gertrude, he had thirteen children, eight daughters and five sons.

Death and succession
Bampfylde was buried at Poltimore and was succeeded in the baronetcy by his eldest son Sir Coplestone Bampfylde, 2nd Baronet (c. 1633–1692), whose great-great-great grandson was George Bampfylde, 1st Baron Poltimore (1786–1858).

Ledger Stone in Poltimore Church

His ledger stone survives, set into the floor of the nave of St Mary's Church, Poltimore, inscribed as follows:
"Here lyeth John Bampfylde Baronett who died Aprill 24 1650 in the 40 yeere of his age. The righteous perisheth and no man layeth it to heart and mercifull men ar taken away none considering that the righteous is taken away from the evill to come".
Above are shown the arms of Bampfylde impaling Copleston (Argent, a chevron engrailed gules between three lion's faces azure).

References

1610s births
1650 deaths
Alumni of Wadham College, Oxford
Baronets in the Baronetage of England
Members of the Middle Temple
English MPs 1640–1648
Roundheads
English lawyers
17th-century English lawyers